The discography of Illy, an Australian rapper, consists of six studio albums and thirty singles (included three as a featured artist).

Studio albums

Singles

As lead artist

As featured artist

Notes

References

Discographies of Australian artists
Hip hop discographies
Pop music discographies